Bucher Thal Historic District, also known as Bucher Valley Historic District, is a national historic district located at East Cocalico Township, Lancaster County, Pennsylvania. The district includes 12 contributing buildings and 1 contributing structure in the rural hamlet of Bucher Thal.  The buildings were built between about 1760 and 1900 and include the Bear's Mill (c. 1815), Jacob Keller House (c. 1785, c. 1900), Keller Barn (1892), Lutz House or Brookside Farm (c. 1774 / c. 1900), Eberly-Lutz House (c. 1760), and Lutz Barn (1873).

It was listed on the National Register of Historic Places in 1987.

References

Georgian architecture in Pennsylvania
Federal architecture in Pennsylvania
Historic districts in Lancaster County, Pennsylvania
Historic districts on the National Register of Historic Places in Pennsylvania
National Register of Historic Places in Lancaster County, Pennsylvania